Scopula pirimacula is a moth of the  family Geometridae. It is found in New Guinea.

The wingspan is 33–34 mm.

References

Moths described in 1916
pirimacula
Moths of New Guinea